The 2018–19 season was Irish provincial rugby union side Connacht Rugby's eighteenth season competing in the Pro14, and the team's twenty-third season as a professional side. It was Andy Friend's first season in charge of the side.

In the regular season, Connacht were in Conference A of the Pro14. The team finished third in their conference, qualifying for the play-offs for the first time since the 2015–16 season where they were beaten by Ulster in the quarter-final. As well as playing in the Pro14, the team competed in the Challenge Cup in Europe. They qualified as one of the best runners up from a pool including Bordeaux, Perpignan and Sale Sharks to reach the quarter-finals, where they again met Sale. A 20–10 defeat saw the team eliminated in the last eight.

In addition to the league and European competitions, the Connacht Eagles development side competed in two new competitions. The first was the Celtic Cup, which saw them play against other Irish provinces' development teams and sides from Wales. The Eagles finished bottom of the Irish conference the inaugural edition of this tournament. The second competition was the Cara Cup, which involved the Irish provinces and the New England Free Jacks, a newly established Major League Rugby side. The Eagles won both of their games, beating Ulster and the Free Jacks.

Background
Following the removal of head coach Kieran Keane one year into a three-year deal, Andy Friend was hired as his replacement. The team also had a new captain for the season, following the retirement of John Muldoon, the province's most-capped player. In August 2018, Jarrad Butler was named as his replacement.

Coaching and management team
Note: Flags indicate national union as has been defined under WR eligibility rules. Individuals may hold more than one non-WR nationality.

Players

Senior playing squad
The Connacht senior squad for 2018–19 was:

 Senior 15's internationally capped players in bold
 Irish Provinces are currently limited to four non-Irish eligible (NIE) players and one non-Irish qualified player (NIQ or "Project Player"). Connacht is exempted from this under a separate development arrangement.
Notes:

Academy squad
The Connacht academy squad for 2018–19 was:

Senior team transfers

Players in
HK  Jonny Murphy from  Rotherham Titans
PR  Conán O'Donnell promoted from Academy
LK  Peter Claffey promoted from Academy
LK  Joe Maksymiw from  Leicester Tigers
BR  Robin Copeland from  Munster
BR  Colby Fainga'a from  Melbourne Rebels
BR  Cillian Gallagher promoted from Academy
SH  Angus Lloyd from  Clontarf
FH  David Horwitz from  Melbourne Rebels
CE  Tom Daly from  Leinster (loan)
CE  Kyle Godwin from  Brumbies
WG  Stephen Fitzgerald from  Munster (loan)

Players out
HK  Pat O'Toole to  San Diego Legion
PR  JP Cooney retired
PR  Denis Coulson to  Lansdowne
LK  Andrew Browne retired
BR  Naulia Dawai to  Otago
BR  Jake Heenan to  Bristol Bears
BR  John Muldoon retired
FH  Steve Crosbie to  Old Belvedere
FH  Andrew Deegan to  Western Force
CE  Pita Ahki to  Toulouse
WG  Cormac Brennan released
WG  Stacey Ili to  Hawke's Bay
WG  Rory Scholes to  Brive

Player's name in italics indicates a transfer that took place during the course of the season

Results

Pro14

Regular season

Play-offs

Challenge Cup

Pool 3

Pool winners and runners-up rankings

Quarter-finals

References

Connacht Rugby seasons